Cho Myung-rae (born 22 March 1955) is a South Korean professor of urban planning at Dankook University previously served as the Ministry of Environment under President Moon Jae-in from 2018 to 2021. 

Before appointed as the Minister, he was the president of the government-funded research institute, Korea Environment Institute, and the association of heads of the environmental research organisations. 

He was previously the co-president of an environment NGO, Environmental Justice, from 2011 to 2017 and chair of Seoul's Sustainable Development Committee from 2013 to 2015. 

Cho holds four degrees - a bachelor in regional development from Dankook University, a master's in environmental planning from Seoul National University and a master's and a doctorate in urban and regional studies from University of Sussex.

References 

Living people
1955 births
Seoul National University alumni
Dankook University alumni
Academic staff of Dankook University
People from Andong
Alumni of the University of Sussex
Environment ministers of South Korea